The Waima language  (sometimes known as Roro, though this is strictly the name of one dialect of Waima) is a Nuclear West Central Papuan Tip language of the Oceanic group of Malayo-Polynesian languages, spoken in Papua New Guinea by 15,000 people. The three dialects, Waima, Roro, and Paitana, are very close.

References

External links
 Waima Grammar Essentials

Central Papuan Tip languages
Languages of Central Province (Papua New Guinea)